Bill Cunningham may refer to:

People 
Bill Cunningham (rugby union) (1874–1927), New Zealand rugby union player
Bill Cunningham (footballer), Irish international footballer active in the 1890s
Bill Cunningham (infielder) (1886–1946), professional baseball infielder
Bill Cunningham (outfielder) (1894–1953), professional baseball outfielder
Bill Cunningham (sportswriter) (1896–1960), American journalist, sportswriter for the Boston Herald, college football player and coach
Bill Cunningham (cricketer) (1900–1984), New Zealand cricketer
Bill Cunningham (Canadian photographer) (1909–1993)
Bill Cunningham (American photographer) (1929–2016), The New York Times
Bill Cunningham (journalist) (born 1932), Canadian television journalist 
Bill Cunningham (judge) (born 1944), author and associate justice of the Kentucky Supreme Court
Bill Cunningham (talk show host) (born 1947), American radio and television talk show host
Bill Cunningham (musician) (born 1950), American bassist with Box Tops

Characters 
Bill Cunningham (Home and Away), in the Australian soap opera Home and Away
Bill Cunningham (The Adventure Series), in The Adventure Series children's novels by Enid Blyton

See also
Billy Cunningham (born 1943), American professional basketball player and coach nicknamed the Kangaroo Kid
William Cunningham (disambiguation)
Willie Cunningham (disambiguation)